Forcipomyia genualis is a species of biting midges (flies in the family Ceratopogonidae).

References

Further reading

External links

 

Ceratopogonidae
Insects described in 1866